Salla Huancane (possibly from Aymara salla rocks, cliffs, wanqa a big stone, -ni a suffix) is a mountain in the Vilcanota mountain range in the Andes of Peru, about  high . It is situated in the Puno Region, Melgar Province, Nuñoa District. It lies southeast of Jonorana.

References

Mountains of Puno Region
Mountains of Peru